Sebastian Pandia is a Papua New Guinean rugby league footballer who represented Papua New Guinea in the 2013 World Cup.

Playing career
In 2013 Pandia played for the Port Moresby Vipers in PNG. His position is second row.

As of 2016, he currently plays for the Ipswich Jets in the Queensland Cup.

References

1990 births
Living people
Ipswich Jets players
Papua New Guinea Hunters players
Papua New Guinea national rugby league team players
Papua New Guinean rugby league players
Port Moresby Vipers players
Rugby league second-rows